Christian Fernandes Marques (born 15 January 2003) is a professional footballer who plays as a defender for Wolverhampton Wanderers. Born in Switzerland, he is a Portugal youth international.

Career
Before the second half of 2018–19, Marques joined the youth academy of English Premier League side Wolves. In 2021, he was sent on loan to B-SAD in Portugal. However due to a lack of game time at the Portuguese club, Marques was recalled by Wolves and given more game time in their U23's setup for the remaining season.

On 1 September 2022, Wolves loaned out Marques to newly promoted League One side, Forest Green Rovers for the 2022–23 season. On 6 September 2022, Marques made his English Football League debut playing 90 minutes for Forest Green in a 2–1 victory over Accrington Stanley. Having suffered a "long-term injury", Marques returned to his parent club on 12 December 2022.

Career statistics

References

External links
 

2003 births
Association football defenders
Belenenses SAD players
Expatriate footballers in England
Living people
Portugal youth international footballers
Portuguese expatriate footballers
Portuguese expatriate sportspeople in England
Portuguese footballers
Swiss expatriate footballers
Swiss expatriate sportspeople in England
Swiss men's footballers
Swiss people of Portuguese descent
Switzerland youth international footballers
Wolverhampton Wanderers F.C. players
Forest Green Rovers F.C. players
English Football League players